Jeffrey Michael Miller (born September 14, 1963) is an American politician who served in the California State Assembly. A small business owner, he served 8 years as both the Mayor and a City Councilman in the City of Corona.

Education
Miller graduated from Foothill High School. He received his bachelor's degree from Cal State Fullerton in 1985.

Political career
In 2000, he was elected to the Corona City Council, where his legislative priorities were to keep the economy growing, the budget balanced, the community safe, and reduce regional traffic.

As a member of the Riverside County Transportation Commission, he worked on the Riverside/Orange Corridor Authority.

Miller served as chairman of the Riverside County Republican Party from 2006 to 2008.

Assembly career 
Miller serves on the Assembly Higher Education Committee as well as the Insurance, Housing and Community Development, and Transportation Committees. In addition, he serves as vice-chair of the Environmental Safety and Toxic Materials Committee. In his previous term, Miller sat on the Appropriations, Transportation, Education, and Environmental Safety and Toxic Materials Committees while also serving as the caucus' Elections Chair.

Miller formerly served on the Assembly Ethics Committee. However, during the Committee's 1990 investigation of improper activities involving fellow Assemblyman Mike Duvall, tapes surfaced showing Duvall telling Miller details of his sexual liaisons with lobbyists, and Miller was removed from the Committee because he had personal knowledge of the matter being investigated.
Miller was reinstated and placed back on the Ethics Committee by Speaker Perez.

In 2012, Miller was the Republican nominee for the California state Senate.  He lost the general election to Democrat Richard Roth.

AB 2098
AB 2098 and its "design build" method could serve as the model for all future road construction projects in California. The California Transportation Commission saw the benefits of the innovative design build method, and decided to unanimously endorse AB 2098. In addition to the California Transportation Commission, AB 2098 garnered 54 bipartisan co-authors in both the State Assembly and the State Senate. Governor Arnold Schwarzenegger signed AB 2098 into law in September 2010.

Miller's work on AB 2098 earned him the award of Legislator of the Year from the Southern California Contractor's Association, as well as recognition from the Orange County Business Council.

Legislative scorecards 
California League of Conservation Voters
Lifetime score 11%
2012 score 24%

California Teachers Association Progress Report on Legislative Action 
2011–2012 – F (Below 60%)

California Small Business Association (CSBA) Legislative Report Card
2009 – Summa Cum Laude
2010 – Magna Cum Laude

National Federation of Independent Business Legislative NFIB Score Card
2009 – 100%
2010 – 91%

California Chamber of Commerce (CalChamber) Legislative Score Card
2009 – 100%
2010 – 100%

Greater Riverside Chambers of Commerce Legislator Vote Record
2010 – 100%

Awards
2009 Legislator of the Year – Western Conservative Political Action Conference
2010 Legislator of the Year – Southern California Contractors Association
2011 Elected Official of the Year – California Transportation Foundation
2011 Commerce Award – Orange Chamber of Commerce
2011 Legislator of the Year – California Manufacturers & Tech Association
2011 Legislator of the Year – California Chemistry Council
2011 Legislator of the Year – Industrial Environmental Association
2011 YMCA's Ira D. Calvert Distinguished Service Award

Election results 
2010 General, California State Assembly (AD 71)
Jeff Miller (R), 66.2%
Gary Kephart (D) 33.8%

2008 General, California State Assembly (AD 71)
Jeff Miller (R), 100%

2008 Primary, California State Assembly (AD 71)
Jeff Miller (R), 56.7%
Neil Blais, (R), 43.3%

References

 http://www.cmta.net/legsample.php?leg=miller_jeff 
 https://web.archive.org/web/20101228031756/http://hellocorona.com/politics/bio/70681/Jeff_Miller.html
 http://www.redcounty.com/node/12375
 https://web.archive.org/web/20111007184246/http://www.rctc.org/downloads/Archive/2008/04%20April/Minutes%2003.12.08.pdf
 http://www.assembly.ca.gov/acs/newcomframeset.asp?committee=11
 http://totaltrafficla.com/2010/10/14/ab-2098-approved-construction-to-proceed-on-91-15-freeways/3166
 http://arc.asm.ca.gov/inc/customPage.aspx?pid=71

External links
 Join California Jeff Miller

1963 births
California city council members
California State University, Fullerton alumni
Living people
Republican Party members of the California State Assembly
Politicians from Boston
Politicians from Corona, California